Daniel Trocmé  (1910- 1944) in  Le Chambon-sur-Lignon, France. He taught  physics, chemistry and natural sciences. He became the principal of a boarding school in 1941. Daniel Trocmé got sent to different detention camps until he died in 1944 from exhaustion and sickness. He was recognized as a Righteous Among the Nations for saving Jews in Le Chambon-sur-Lignon in France.

Activity During WWII  
When Trocmé became the principal of a boarding school, La Maison des Roches, in 1941 in France, he helped many Jewish refugee children there, an act that was explicitly against the law, and fought for human rights . Between the years 1941- 1943 Daniel Trocmé and his cousin André Trocmé, managed to smuggle about 5,000 Jews through the village of Le Chambon-sur-Lignon and saved them from death.

In June 1943 the Nazi army broke into the school to search for Trocmé and his Jewish students. At that time, Trocmé wasn't present at school. Although he could have escaped, he chose to return to his Jewish students. Under threats, he got taken along with 18 of his students to be arrested. While he was being investigated, he continued to show courage and did everything to lift the spirit of his students. He claimed against the Nazis that he was just protecting the helpless. Daniel Trocmé got sent to different detention camps until he died in 1944 from exhaustion and sickness at the age of 34.

Honors 
On March 18, 1976, Yad Vashem recognized Daniel Trocmé as a Righteous Among the Nations.

References

External links 
 The partisans and ghetto fighters website:  Le Chambon-sur-Lignon
 Le Chambon-sur-Lignon

French Righteous Among the Nations
1910 births
1944 deaths
French people who died in the Holocaust